Trojanus of Saintes (died c.530) was a sixth-century bishop of Saintes, in France. He is mentioned in semi-legendary terms by Gregory of Tours. He is identified with the author of a surviving letter to Eumerius of Nantes.

He is a Catholic saint, known also as Trojan and Troyen; his feast day is November 30.

References
William Smith, Henry Wace, A Dictionary of Christian Biography, Literature, Sects and Doctrines. Volume IV, article Trojanus, p. 1054.

Notes

6th-century Frankish bishops
Bishops of Saintes
530 deaths
6th-century Frankish saints
Year of birth unknown
6th-century Frankish writers
6th-century Latin writers
Latin letter writers